Blackwater railway station is a railway station in Blackwater, a town on the borders of Hampshire, Surrey and Berkshire in England.  The station is managed by Great Western Railway, who provide services on the North Downs Line from Reading to Redhill and Gatwick Airport.

Blackwater station has two platforms: platform 1 for services towards Gatwick Airport and platform 2 for services towards Reading. The station is unstaffed and has emergency telephones on both platforms. Both platforms have small sheltered seating areas. It opened in 1849 and was called Blackwater & Camberley.

Services
Great Western Railway provide two services per hour between Reading and Redhill (one fast and one stopping). On Sundays, an hourly service operates between Reading and Gatwick Airport.

References

Railway stations in Hampshire
DfT Category F2 stations
Former South Eastern Railway (UK) stations
Railway stations in Great Britain opened in 1849
Railway stations served by Great Western Railway
1849 establishments in England